Cyril Butler Holmes (11 January 1915 – 21 June 1996) was an English athlete who competed for Great Britain in the 1936 Summer Olympics. He was also capped three times for the England national rugby union team

He was born and died in Bolton.

In 1936 he was eliminated in the quarter-finals of the 100 metres event.

Holmes was one of Britain's top sprinters in the late 1930s. In 1937 he won the AAA 100y in 9.9 seconds and both sprints at the World University Games.

At the 1938 Empire Games he won the gold medal in the 100 yards in 9.7 seconds and 220 yards in 21.2 seconds. He was also a member of the English relay team which won the silver medal in the 4×110 yards competition. In 1939 he won the AAA 220 yards in 21.9 seconds.

Personal Bests: 100y – 9.7 (1938); 100 – 10.5 (1939); 220y – 21.2 (1938).

References

External links

Scrum: Cyril Holmes

1915 births
1996 deaths
Sportspeople from Bolton
English male sprinters
British male sprinters
Olympic athletes of Great Britain
Athletes (track and field) at the 1936 Summer Olympics
Athletes (track and field) at the 1938 British Empire Games
Commonwealth Games gold medallists for England
Commonwealth Games silver medallists for England
England international rugby union players
Commonwealth Games medallists in athletics
Lancashire County RFU players
20th-century English people
Medallists at the 1938 British Empire Games